Swiftwater is an unincorporated community in Pocono Township, Monroe County, Pennsylvania, United States.

The community is located within the Paradise Creek Watershed.  Upper Swiftwater creek is designated by the PA DEP as exceptional value waters (EV). The community of Swiftwater is located within and around unique topographic features in the Poconos, which encompass the Pocono Plateau Escarpment.  Land use
consists of 70% forested land, 14% low density residential, 13.6% agricultural lands and
approximately 2.4% wetlands. The acres of forested land are nearby to State Game Lands, an important bird area, which support beaver, raccoon, gray, fox, coyote, and mink, and Snow Shoe Hares.

In 1897 Richard Slee created the Pocono Biological Laboratories in Swiftwater. Swiftwater is home to the biggest flu vaccine plant in the United States.

Swiftwater is also the home of the Pocono Cheesecake Factory, located on SR 611.

References

Pocono Mountains
Unincorporated communities in Monroe County, Pennsylvania
Influenza vaccines
Unincorporated communities in Pennsylvania